The 1937 World Table Tennis Championships mixed doubles was the 11th edition of the mixed doubles championship.  

Bohumil Váňa and Věra Votrubcová defeated Stanislav Kolář and Marie Kettnerová in the final by three sets to nil.

Results

See also
 List of World Table Tennis Championships medalists

References

-